WSOO (1230 AM) is a radio station in Sault Ste. Marie, Michigan. The station airs a gold-based soft adult contemporary format during daytime hours, featuring music from the 1960s through the 2000s, and features paranormal talk programming in late night timeslots. WSOO has been owned and operated by Sovereign Communications since 2003, and is part of Sovereign's 7-station cluster in the Sault Ste. Marie and Newberry market (see Infobox).

Broadcasting since June 25, 1940, WSOO is the first radio station to broadcast in the Sault Ste. Marie, Michigan radio market, and was only preceded in the region by the now-closed Sault Ste. Marie, Ontario AM station CFYN (formerly CJIC.) The station was launched and owned by the Hiawathaland Broadcasting Company, who later shifted the station to a middle of the road format in the late 1960s, prior to selling the station to Patterson Communications (later the Miami County Broadcasting Company) in 1971, as owned by Richard E. Hunt, who also owned WCBY AM & FM in Cheboygan and WPTW AM & FM in his hometown of Piqua, Ohio. WSOO was purchased by Fabiano-Strickler Communications in 1981, who shifted to its current adult contemporary/talk format in 1989. The station was ultimately purchased by current owners Sovereign Communications in 2003.

Live sports coverage on WSOO includes Detroit Red Wings, Detroit Tigers, and Sault High Blue Devils games, as well as the regional high school sports talk show Coach's Corner, and annual coverage of the International 500 snowmobile race in Sault Ste. Marie. Syndicated talk programs include the late-night paranormal programs Ground Zero and Coast to Coast AM, while the station also airs the Sunday morning Baptist televangelist program Good News From The Good Book with Pastor Tim Rader, out of nearby Kinross, Michigan. The Handyman Show with Glenn Haege previously aired on WSOO on Sundays until Haege's passing in September 2017. As well, the station features hourly newsbreaks from ABC Radio.

Local on-air personalities at WSOO include morning host Allan Gibbs, DJ/news anchor John Bell, sports anchor Mark SanAngelo, chief meteorologist Karl Bohnak, and Sault High Blue Devils play-by-play announcer & Coach's Corner host Dave Watson.

Sources
Michiguide.com - WSOO History

External links
WSOO Website

SOO
Mainstream adult contemporary radio stations in the United States
Soft adult contemporary radio stations in the United States
Radio stations established in 1940
1940 establishments in Michigan